Evening Chronicle is the name of several newspapers:

Manchester Evening Chronicle, founded by Sir Edward Hulton in 1897. Later known as Evening Chronicle. Merged into Newcastle Evening Chronicle in 1963  
Newcastle Evening Chronicle, now known as Evening Chronicle, or just The Chronicle, a daily newspaper produced in Newcastle upon Tyne, covering Tyne and Wear, southern Northumberland and northern County Durham
Oldham Evening Chronicle, now a defunct daily newspaper published each weekday evening serving the Metropolitan Borough of Oldham, in Greater Manchester, England.

See also
The Sun Chronicle, formerly The Attleboro Sun and the Evening Chronicle, daily newspaper in Attleboro, Massachusetts, United States
The Chronicle (disambiguation)